South View LRT station is an elevated Light Rail Transit (LRT) station on the Bukit Panjang LRT line in Choa Chu Kang, Singapore, located at the junction of Choa Chu Kang Way and Choa Chu Kang Avenue 2. The station was completed on 11 June 1999 and was opened to the public on 6 November that year.

Etymology
The name of the station is taken from one of the primary schools in Choa Chu Kang district known as South View Primary School. Being the first station to be named after the institution, prior approval was given from the school to the LTA.

History 
As of February 2017, South View station has Half-Height Platform Barriers installed at both platforms of the station.

References

External links

Railway stations in Singapore opened in 1999
Choa Chu Kang
LRT stations of Bukit Panjang LRT Line
Light Rail Transit (Singapore) stations